Frank Richards (September 15, 1909 – April 15, 1992) was an American character actor, typically portraying a hoodlum or thug with a menacing appearance.

Richards was born in New York City and raised in Fall River, Massachusetts. 

Richards began acting in stock theater in Cape Cod while he worked 16 hours a day as a driver of a fruit truck. He continued his stock acting for eight years. He acted on Broadway in The Wanhope Building (1947), Embezzled Heaven (1944), The World We Make (1939), and Brown Danube (1939).

After serving in the military during World War II, Richards studied dialects, diction, and speech in New York, in addition to working in radio and television.

He appeared in 150 films and televisions shows from 1940 into the mid 1980s. He appeared in a 1952 episode of Superman  "The Night of Terror" and a 1953 episode of The Lone Ranger. His first stage appearance was in 1938 and his last film was John Cassavetes' A Woman Under the Influence in 1974.

On April 15, 1992, Richards died in Las Vegas, Nevada.

Selected filmography

 Before I Hang (1940) - Otto Kron - Convict
 Arizona (1940) - Dugan (uncredited)
 Tall, Dark and Handsome (1941) - Mobster (uncredited)
 Sky Raiders (1941, Serial) - Murdock - Henchman [Ch. 8] (uncredited)
 Hold That Ghost (1941) - Gunman (uncredited)
 Public Enemies (1941) - Shelby
 The Corsican Brothers (1941) - Colonna's Henchman (uncredited)
 Reap the Wild Wind (1942) - Cutler Man in Barrel Room (uncredited)
 Alias Boston Blackie (1942) - Mack - Prisoner Next to Joe (uncredited)
 Sunday Punch (1942) - Bystander (uncredited)
 Cairo (1942) - Alfred
 A Man's World (1942) - Thomas (uncredited)
 You Can't Escape Forever (1942) - Scotty - Greer's Henchman (uncredited)
 Redhead from Manhattan (1943) - Fisherman (uncredited)
 The House on 92nd Street (1945) - German Spy Trainee (uncredited)
 A Double Life (1947) - Stagehand (uncredited)
 The Story of Mr. Hobbs (1947) - Spike
 Appointment with Murder (1948) - 2nd Thug (uncredited)
 I Cheated the Law (1949) - Bartender (uncredited)
 The Set-Up (1949) - Bat - Program Vendor (uncredited)
 The Crooked Way (1949) - Nick - Bailbondsman (uncredited)
 Canadian Pacific (1949) - Railroad Worker (uncredited)
 Come to the Stable (1949) - Lefty - Rossi's Goon (uncredited)
 Slattery's Hurricane (1949) - Bartender (uncredited)
 The Cowboy and the Indians (1949) - Smiley Martin
 Thieves' Highway (1949) - Cab Driver (uncredited)
 Prison Warden (1949) - Cory (uncredited)
 Tough Assignment (1949) - Steve
 The Threat (1949) - Lefty
 The Outriders (1950) - Outrider with Knife (uncredited)
 Black Hand (1950) - Semi-Moron (uncredited)
 Western Pacific Agent (1950) - Keystone
 Father of the Bride (1950) - Truck Driver (uncredited)
 Love That Brute (1950) - Gangster (uncredited)
 No Way Out (1950) - Mac (uncredited)
 Wyoming Mail (1950) - Prison Contact (uncredited)
 Kim (1950) - Abul (uncredited)
 California Passage (1950) - Sneed (uncredited)
 The Scarf (1951) - Gargantua (uncredited)
 Double Crossbones (1951) - Tavern Bouncer (uncredited)
 Across the Wide Missouri (1951) - Tige Shannon (uncredited)
 South of Caliente (1951) - Studsy Denning
 Love Is Better Than Ever (1952) - Mr. Carney - Wardrobe Man (uncredited)
 Carbine Williams (1952) - Truex
 Pat and Mike (1952) - Sam Garsell
 The Savage (1952) - Sgt. Norris
 Stop, You're Killing Me (1952) - Black Hat Gallagher (uncredited)
 Girls in the Night (1953) - Bartender Danny (uncredited)
 The System (1953) - Charley, Merrick's Butler
 The Caddy (1953) - Burly Caddie (uncredited)
 I, the Jury (1953) - Killer Thompson (uncredited)
 Clipped Wings (1953) - Cralia Dupree (uncredited)
 Prisoners of the Casbah (1953) - 2nd Thief
 Money from Home (1953) - Angry Truck Driver (uncredited)
 Tennessee Champ (1954) - J.B. Backett
 Return from the Sea (1954) - Bartender
 Destry (1954) - Dummy
 The Atomic Kid (1954) - Casino Officer (uncredited)
 Pirates of Tripoli (1955) - Zurtah (uncredited)
 New York Confidential (1955) - Hoodlum (uncredited)
 A Bullet for Joey (1955) - Ship Officer (uncredited)
 Spy Chasers (1955) - George
 Guys and Dolls (1955) - Man with Packages (uncredited)
 The Man with the Golden Arm (1955) - Blind Barfly (uncredited)
 The Killing (1956) - Track Employee in Locker Room (uncredited)
 Man from Del Rio (1956) - Ken, the Stableman (uncredited)
 Running Target (1956) - Castagna
 The Desperados Are in Town (1956) - Mr. Tawson (uncredited)
 The Storm Rider (1957) - Will Feylan
 The Persuader (1957) - Steve
 Gun Battle at Monterey (1957) - Gus (uncredited)
 The Hard Man (1957) - Vince Kane (uncredited)
 Escape from Red Rock (1957) - Price
 The World Was His Jury (1958) - Able Bodied Seaman Milo Radvitch aka Mikel Petrov (uncredited)
 Teacher's Pet (1958) - Cab Driver (uncredited)
 How to Make a Monster (1958) - Studio Groundskeeper (uncredited)
 The Cry Baby Killer (1958) - Pete Gambelli
 The Black Orchid (1958) - Hood (uncredited)
 Revolt in the Big House (1958) - Jake
 Lonelyhearts (1958) - Taxi Driver
 Arson for Hire (1959) - Man Making Phone Calls
 The Hangman (1959) - Zimmerman (uncredited)
 The Gunfight at Dodge City (1959) - Burly Man with Saloon Girl (uncredited)
 Bells Are Ringing (1960) - Barney Lampwick's Friend - Man on Street (uncredited)
 From the Terrace (1960) - The Bartender (uncredited)
 The Hook (1963) - Crewman Kaskevitch
 The Greatest Story Ever Told (1965) - (uncredited)
 A Woman Under the Influence (1974) - Adolph

Selected Television

References

External links

1909 births
1992 deaths
American male film actors
20th-century American male actors
American male stage actors
American male television actors